Oak Hill Historic District is a national historic district at Hagerstown, Washington County, Maryland, United States. It is characterized generally by large scale houses built in the first third of the 20th century and standing in a garden city type setting. The houses are generally Colonial or Georgian revival in stylistic influences.

It was added to the National Register of Historic Places in 1987.

References

External links
, including photo from 1988, at Maryland Historical Trust
Boundary Map of the Oak Hill Historic District, Washington County, at Maryland Historical Trust

Historic districts in Washington County, Maryland
Hagerstown, Maryland
Historic districts on the National Register of Historic Places in Maryland
National Register of Historic Places in Washington County, Maryland